David Deas was the twelfth intendant of Charleston, South Carolina, serving from 1802 to 1803.

His father, David Deas, and uncle, John Deas were reportedly the third largest slave traders in the US. Both hailed from Leith, Scotland. John Deas sailed for Providence of Carolina on 28 January, 1749, where he joined elder brother, David.

He was elected on September 1, 1800, to a first term as a warden (city council member) for Charleston, South Carolina. He married Mary Sommers on October 16, 1800. He was elected intendant in September 1802. Deas implemented a quarantine of ships having been to New York City to prevent the spread of a contagious fever to Charleston in September and October 1803. In 1803 he began serving in the South Carolina House of Representatives where he, among other things, sought to repeal part of the Negro Act providing that slaves could be imported for free. His death in 1822 is recorded in the return of interments in the City of Charleston as suicide.

References

American people of Scottish descent
Mayors of Charleston, South Carolina
1771 births
1822 deaths